is a railway station in the town of Mihama, Mikata District, Fukui Prefecture, Japan, operated by West Japan Railway Company (JR West).

Lines

Station layout
The station consists of two opposed side platforms connected by a footbridge. The station has a Midori no Madoguchi staffed ticket office.

Platforms

History
It was renamed to its present name on 10 April 1956. With the privatization of Japanese National Railways (JNR) on 1 April 1987, the station came under the control of JR West.

Passenger statistics
In fiscal 2016, the station was used by an average of 282 passengers daily (boarding passengers only).

Surrounding area
Mihama Tourist Association

See also
 List of railway stations in Japan

References

External links

  

Railway stations in Fukui Prefecture
Stations of West Japan Railway Company
Railway stations in Japan opened in 1917
Obama Line
Mihama, Fukui